The 1995 Wagner Seahawks football team represented Wagner College in the 1995 NCAA Division I-AA football season. This year was the team's final season as an NCAA Division I-AA independent program before transitioning to being a member of the Northeast Conference (NEC). The Seahawks were led by 15th-year head coach Walt Hameline and played their home games at Wagner College Stadium.

Schedule

References

Wagner
Wagner Seahawks football seasons
Wagner Seahawks football